The Kranzberg Arts Foundation or Kranzberg Arts Foundation is a non-profit foundation dedicated to promoting arts, music, orchestra, jazz, theater, and culture in St. Louis, Missouri, United States. The Kranzberg Arts Foundation is responsible for the creation and growth of the Midtown St. Louis Neighborhood which includes the Grand Center Arts District.

The Kranzberg Arts Foundation supports 43 organizations.

Dwell in Other Futures 
In April 2018, the Kranzberg Arts Foundation supported a conference, Dwell in Other Futures, founded by Gavin Kroeber, Tim Portlock, and Rebecca Wanzo and hosted at Kranzberg's .ZACK, featured Samuel Delany, Treasure Shields Redmond and Sophia Al-Maria. The conference focused on afrofuturism and the "city of tomorrow". An art exhibition also opened at the show and featured artists Damon Davis, Addoley Dzegede working with artifacts from National Building Arts Center, and a collaboration between Basil Kincaid and Reuben Reuel.

Affordable Artist Housing and Studios 
In June 2018, Kranzberg Arts Foundation announced a program with the Regional Arts Commission to purchase 25 properties and develop them into affordable housing and studios for artists.

The Sound of St. Louis 
In September 2018, with the untimely cancellation of St. Louis music festival, LouFest, The Kranzberg Arts Foundation, Urban Chestnut Brewing, Gaslight Records, Venture Cafe, Regional Arts Commission, Fabricatorz Foundation, and Express Scripts sponsored a showcase called The Sound of St. Louis featuring over 15 local musical acts at The Grendel in Grand Center Arts District, St. Louis. The acts performing at the Sounds of St. Louis include Ben Reece's Unity Quartet, Bob DeBoo, The Burney Sisters, DJ AgileOne, Dracla, Grace Basement, Jesse Gannon, Kasimu-tet, Kevin Bowers' Nova, The Knuckles, Mo Egeston, Owen Ragland, Ptah Williams, The River Kittens, Scrub & Ace Ha, and Tonina.

Chris Hansen, executive director of the Kranzberg Arts Foundation, said "our organizational mission is to serve and support and the void that was left needed to have civic-minded organizations and companies to step up to protect our local talent. It was an obvious and natural decision for us to do this."

Venues 
 .ZACK
 The Big Top
 The Kranzberg
 The Dark Room at The Grandel
 Grandel Theater
 The Marcelle
 Sophie's Artist Lounge and Cocktail Club

Galleries 
 The Dark Room
 The Kranzberg Gallery

See also 
 Grand Center Arts District
 Arch Grants

References

External links 
 Kranzberg Arts Foundation Official Website

Midtown St. Louis
Non-profit corporations
Community building
Companies based in St. Louis
Organizations based in St. Louis
Non-profit organizations based in St. Louis